1969 in philosophy

Events

Publications
 Gilles Deleuze, The Logic of Sense (1969)
 John Passmore, Philosophical Reasoning
 G.J. Warnock, Berkeley
 Richard Wollheim, F. H. Bradley

Births
 April 22 - Justin Clemens
 August 7 - Idris Azad
 August 7 - Gonzalo Rodríguez Pereyra
 October 5 - Ásta Kristjana Sveinsdóttir
 October 12 - Jason Stanley
 October 30 - Ronald van Raak
 December 1 - Richard Carrier
 December 20 - Alain de Botton
 John Corvino
 David Ross Fryer
 David Koepsell
 Björn Kraus
 Erin Manning (theorist)
 Lisa H. Schwartzman
 Thich Nhat Tu
 Jeremy Weate

Deaths
 January 6 - Shalva Nutsubidze, Georgian philosopher, translator and public benefactor (born 1888)
 January 18 - Hans Freyer (born 1887)
 February 26 - Karl Jaspers (born 1883)
 March 23 - Rudolf Pannwitz (born 1881)
 March 27 - Jacob Loewenberg (born 1882)
 March 30 - Viktor Sonnenfeld (born 1902)
 May 14 - Walter Pitts (born 1923)
 June 10 - José Gaos (born 1900)
 July 9 - Shankar Vaman Dandekar (born 1896)
 July 11 - Friedrich Siegmund-Schultze (born 1885)
 July 15 - Leonard Hodgson (born 1889)
 August 2 - Herbert James Paton (born 1887)
 August 6 - Theodor W. Adorno (born 1903)
 September 3 - Curt John Ducasse, French philosopher (born 1881)
 October 6 - Arthur Prior (born 1914)
 November 28 - Honorio Delgado (born 1892)

Philosophy
20th-century philosophy
Philosophy by year